Tyrone Township is a civil township of Kent County in the U.S. state of Michigan. As of the 2010 census, the township had a total population of 4,731.

The village of Kent City is located within the township, as is the eastern portion of the village of Casnovia.

History
The area was first settled as early as 1849 and formally organized as a civil township in 1855.

Geography

The Rogue River flows through the township and also includes the Rogue River State Game Area.

Major highways
  runs briefly through the southwestern corner of the township before merging concurrent with M-46.
  runs east–west through the southern portion of the township.

Demographics
At the census of 2000, there were 4,304 people, 1,449 households, and 1,185 families residing in the township. The racial makeup of the township was 96.98% White, 0.12% African American, 0.28% Native American, 0.21% Asian, 0.00% Pacific Islander, 1.53% from other races, and 0.88% from two or more races. 4.93% of the population were Hispanic or Latino of any race.

There were 1,449 households, out of which 43.8% had children under the age of 18 living with them, 66.9% were married couples living together, 10.3% had a female householder with no husband present, and 18.2% were non-families. 14.7% of all households were made up of individuals, and 4.3% had someone living alone who was 65 years of age or older. The average household size was 2.96 and the average family size was 3.26.

In the township the population was spread out, with 31.7% under the age of 18, 9.1% from 18 to 24, 30.9% from 25 to 44, 20.5% from 45 to 64, and 7.8% who were 65 years of age or older. The median age was 32 years. For every 100 females, there were 99.8 males. For every 100 females aged 18 and over, there were 99.9 males.

The median income for a household in the township was $48,006, and the median income for a family was $51,750. Males had a median income of $37,429 versus $27,381 for females. The per capita income for the township was $18,879. 9.4% of the population and 6.1% of families were below the poverty line. Out of the total population, 11.0% of those under the age of 18 and 11.6% of those 65 and older were living below the poverty line.

Education
Almost the entire township is served by Kent City Community Schools.  A very small portion of the southeast corner of the township is served by Sparta Area Schools, and a very small northern portion is served by Grant Public School District to the north in Newaygo County.

References

External links
Tyrone Township official website

Townships in Michigan
Townships in Kent County, Michigan
Grand Rapids metropolitan area
Populated places established in 1855
1855 establishments in Michigan